Boris Bakić (born 23 May 1986) is a Montenegrin retired professional basketball player.

Professional career
Bakić grew up with KK Budućnost youth team.

While at KK Partizan, he won Adriatic League trophy (2007). During his stay in Partizan, he also won three national championship trophies (2005, 2006, 2007) and cup trophy (2007).

In the 2012–13 season he played for MZT Skopje and won the Macedonian championship and Macedonian Cup. In June 2013, he signed with Igokea. With Igokea Bakić won the Championship of Bosnia and Herzegovina in 2014.

In September 2014, he signed with Metalac Valjevo. In February 2016, he left Metalac and signed with Romanian club BCM U Piteşti for the rest of the 2015–16 Liga Națională season.

The 2016–17 season, Bakić started with the Serbian League club Mladost Zemun, but on 7 December 2016 he left Mladost and signed with Mornar Bar. He retired as a player with Prievidza in 2019.

National team career
He was a member of Serbia & Montenegro U20 national team and played both at the 2005 and 2006 U20 European Championship (won one bronze and one gold medal).

Bakić represented the senior men's Montenegrin national team at the EuroBasket 2011 held in Lithuania. Over 5 tournament games, he averaged 1.2 points per game, as Montenegro finished the tournament after first phase.

See also 
 List of KK Crvena zvezda players with 100 games played

References

External links
 ABA League profile
 Euroleague profile
 FIBA profile

1986 births
Living people
ABA League players
Basketball League of Serbia players
KK Crvena zvezda players
KK Budućnost players
KK Partizan players
KK Radnički Kragujevac (2009–2014) players
KK Igokea players
KK Metalac Valjevo players
KK Mladost Zemun players
KK Mornar Bar players
Montenegrin expatriate basketball people in Serbia
Montenegrin men's basketball players
Point guards
Shooting guards
Sportspeople from Podgorica